Jažince is a settlement in the Štrpce municipality in Republic of Kosovo. At the time of the 1991 census it had 644 inhabitants.

Notes and references
Notes:

References:

Villages in Štrpce
Kosovo–North Macedonia border crossings
Serbian enclaves in Kosovo